Camilo de Sousa Vieira (born March 22, 1986 in Ceres), or simply Camilo, is a Brazilian football goalkeeper, who plays for Sousa

Contract
May 6, 2009 to December 15, 2009

External links
sambafoot.com
 CBF
 meuSPORT

1986 births
Living people
Sportspeople from Goiás
Brazilian footballers
Esporte Clube Noroeste players
Sport Club do Recife players
Grêmio Barueri Futebol players
Association football goalkeepers